Hyperreal may refer to:

 Hyperreal numbers, an extension of the real numbers in mathematics that are used in non-standard analysis
 Hyperreal.org, a rave culture website based in San Francisco, US
 Hyperreality, a term used in semiotics and postmodern philosophy
 Hyperrealism (visual arts), a school of painting
 Hyperreal (The Shamen song), 1990
 Hyperreal (Flume song)", 2017
 Hyperreal, a song by My Ticket Home

See also 
 Hypernumber
 Superreal number